Pinus occidentalis, also known as the Hispaniolan pine or Hispaniola pine, (or in Spanish: pino criollo ) is a pine tree endemic to the island of Hispaniola (split between the Dominican Republic and Haiti).

Ecology
It is the eponymous species of the Hispaniolan pine forests ecosystem, in which it constitutes a majority of the biomass present.
Another endemic species, the Hispaniolan crossbill (Loxia megaplaga), feeds almost exclusively on the cones of P. occidentalis.

References

occidentalis
Flora of the Dominican Republic
Flora of Haiti
Taxa named by Olof Swartz